Senior Prom is a 1958 American musical film directed by David Lowell Rich and starring Jill Corey and Paul Hampton. 
others, as well as a rare non-Stooge appearance by Moe Howard.

Plot

Cast
Jill Corey as Gay Sherridan
Paul Hampton as Tom Harper
James Komack as Dog
Barbara Bostock as Flip
Tom Laughlin as Carter Breed III
Keely Smith as the Singer

References

External links

1958 films
1958 musical films
American musical films
Films directed by David Lowell Rich
Columbia Pictures films
1950s English-language films
1950s American films